Katrine Aalerud (born 4 December 1994) is a Norwegian professional racing cyclist, who currently rides for UCI Women's WorldTeam . She rode in the women's road race at the 2016 UCI Road World Championships, finishing in 39th place.

Major results
2016 
 3rd Road Race, National Road Championships
2017 
 National Road Championships
2nd Road Race
3rd Time Trial
2019 
 2nd Time Trial, National Road Championships
2020 
 1st  Time Trial, Norwegian National Road Championship
 9th Liège–Bastogne–Liège
2021
 1st  Time Trial, Norwegian National Road Championship
 3rd Overall Setmana Ciclista Valenciana
 5th Overall Vuelta a Burgos Feminas
 7th Emakumeen Nafarroako Klasikoa

References

External links
 
 
 
 
 
 

1994 births
Living people
Norwegian female cyclists
People from Vestby
Olympic cyclists of Norway
Cyclists at the 2020 Summer Olympics
Sportspeople from Viken (county)
21st-century Norwegian women